Buffy the Vampire Slayer: The Remaining Sunlight is a trade paperback collecting comic stories based on the Buffy the Vampire Slayer television series.

Story description

Buffy the Vampire Slayer #1
Comic title: Wu-tang Fang 

Buffy Summers and her friends come face to face with some kung fu vampires on their way from the Bronze and are threatened by a figure in a straw hat. They soon discover that the black belts of Sunnydale are being eaten.

Buffy the Vampire Slayer #2
Comic title: Halloween 

Willow runs away from home when her parents want her to stop seeing her boyfriend, Oz. Walking after sunset, she is grabbed by vampires for a Halloween snack. Buffy comes to the rescue.

Buffy the Vampire Slayer #3
Comic title: Cold Turkey 

Buffy Summers' holidays continue with Thanksgiving approaching. The day soon gathers pace whilst there are some bizarre things happening around Buffy's house. Buffy wants answers: What happened a vampire-opponent who survived the fateful Halloween massacre? Why is someone searching through her garbage? Why do so many people go grocery shopping at the last minute?

DHP Annual 1998

Comic title: MacGuffins

Buffy Summers gets a present from Giles – a test in the shape of two troublemaking green critters. How to get rid of them?

The story was printed black and white in DHP Annual 1998 and colored for this reprint.

Continuity
Supposed to be set in Buffy season 3.

Canonical issues
Buffy comics such as this one are not usually considered by fans as canonical. However, unlike fan fiction, overviews summarizing their story, written early in the writing process, were approved by both Fox and Joss Whedon (or his office), and the books were therefore later published as officially Buffy merchandise.

Collected editions
Trade paperback collections include:

Remaining Sunlight (88 pages, April 2002, Titan Books, Dark Horse)
 Omnibus Volume 3

Notes

Comics based on Buffy the Vampire Slayer